Gilliesieae is a tribe of herbaceous geophyte plants belonging to the subfamily Allioideae of the Amaryllis family (Amaryllidaceae). Described in 1826, it contains fifteen genera and about eighty species. It has been variously treated as a subfamily or tribe. It is native to the Southern United States, Central and South America, predominantly Chile. Of the three tribes of genera that make up the subfamily Allioideae, Gilliesieae is the largest and most variable. The tribe was divided into two tribes in 2014, Gilliesiae s.s. and Leucocoryneae, based on differences in floral symmetry and septal nectaries.

Description 
Gilliesieae are perennial herbaceous geophytes characterised by simple or prolific bulbs, sometimes with lateral rhizomes. Leaf sheaths long, tepals more or less fused and corona absent. Spathe formed from 1–2 bracts. Style more or less gynobasic. Ovary usually has two ovules per locule, side by side. There are 2–3 stamens. The commonest chromosome number is x=4. Gilliesiae is distinguished from Leucocoryneae by zygomorphic floral symmetry and the absence of septal nectaries. By contrast Leucocoryneae are zygomorphic and have septal nectaries.

Leucocorynae 
Leucocoryneae are terrestrial perennial herbaceous plants. They have tunicate bulbs, which may be simple or prolific (with bulbils), rarely lateral rhizomes. The outer bulb scales (cataphyll) are papyraceous, colourless or violaceous (Zoellnerallium). They may or may not have a garlic like odour. The leaves are large, with membranous sheaths, usually forming an underground neck. The leaf lamina is flat, green, and glaucous, glabrous or papillose. The inflorescence may be pauciflor (Ipheion, Beauverdia, rarely Tristagma) or pluriflor (up to 30). The spathe is formed by a single bifid membranous bract (Ipheion) or from two papyraceous bracts partially fused at the base. The pedicels, which are not articulated at the receptacles, are papilose or glabrous. The flowers are hermaphroditic and actinomorphic, the perianth corolla like, with 6 (8 in Beauverdia) tepals fused at their base to form a floral tube arising around the ovary. There are 6 stamens (8 in Beauverdia), 3 fertile and 3 not (staminodes), rarely 6 (Leucocoryne), in two whorls of three (Tristagma, Ipheion) or one whorl. The filaments which are adnate (fused) to the tepals, uniting at their bases, the anthers dorsifixed (attached at their back) are oblong, yellow brown or green. The ovaries are superior and sessile with three (four in Beauverdia) carpels and locules (four in Beauverdia) and septal nectaries. The number of ovules is either 2, 4 or 30 per locule, arranged in two rows. The style is apical and persistent. The stigma has three (four in Beauverdia) lobes, or is trifid, and is papillose. The capsule, which is humifuse (Ipheion, Beauverdia) or aerocarpic, globose or prismatic, and contains many seeds (pluriseeded) which are irregular and polyhedral with a black tegmen. The embryo is linear or slightly curved.

Taxonomy

History 
Lindley described Gilliesia in 1826, after fellow botanist John Gillies, placing this genus and another Chilean genus Miersia which he described at the same time, in a new taxon, Gilliesieae. These and related genera have been variously assigned to families Liliaceae, Amaryllidaceae, Alliaceae and even Gilliesiaceae over their history, often as tribe Gilliesieae Lindl. In 1985, Dahlgren's treatment of the Alliaceae (now Allioideae) within the monocotyledons, recognised three subfamilies.  Gilliesioideae (Lindl.) Am., together with Agapanthoideae and Allioideae. These corresponded to Hutchinson's (1959) three tribes within his expanded Amaryllidaceae (Agapantheae, Allieae, and Gilesieae). The Gilliesioideae contained nine genera endemic to the southern part of South America, predominantly Chile.

Phylogenetic era (subfamily Gilliesioideae) 1996 
In 1996, a molecular phylogenetic study of the rbcL gene showed Gilliesia and related genera clustering in a separate clade at subfamilial level. The authors rejected the proposal of Traub (1982) of a separate family, Gilliesiaceae (later resurrected by Ravenna), but rather created the Gilliesioideae, as one of three subfamilies within Alliaceae, together with Allioideae and Tulbaghioideae. As phylogenetically constructed, Gilliesioideae (Gilliesioideae (Lindl.) Am., Botany: 134. 1832 - Gilliesieae Lindl. in Bot. Reg.: ad t. 992. 1826. - Type: Gilliesia Lindl.) consisted of those New World Alliaceae not included in the other two subfamilies, which included both the former Gilliesieae (Ancrumia, Erinna, Gethyum, Gilliesia, Miersia, Solaria and Trichlora) together with Ipheion, Leucocoryne, Nothoscordum, and Tristagma. Garaventia and Steinmannia were not included in the study, but considered to be part of this newly reconstructed subfamily, a total of 13 genera.  This is the circumscription which the Angiosperm Phylogeny Group (APG) accepted in the APG classification of 1998 and which later became known as Alliaceae sensu stricto (s.s.). In the 2003 update (APGII) it was proposed to include Agapanthaceae and Amaryllidaceae under Alliaceae, while recognising an argument for renaming the overarching family from Alliaceae to Amaryllidaceae.

This construction of Gilliesioideae, which represented nearly all the Alliaceae genera (i.e. except Allium and Tulbaghia), implicitly recognised that it was composed of two groups or tribes, informally referred to as Ipheieae and Gilliesieae. The Ipheieae were actinomorphic, and included Ipheion, Nothoscordum, Leucocoryne s.l. (including Pabellonia and Stemmatium). Gilliesieae were rare, mostly zygomorphic, mostly endemic to Chile and typified by Gilliesa. It contained about eight genera (Ancrumia, Gethyum, Gilliesia, Miersia, Schickendantziella, Solaria and Trichlora). The genera of Gilliesioideae were thus morphologically and genetically diverse, which has made generic delimitation problematic and many species have at times been included in various different genera, and a number of genera have been shown to be polyphyletic. Consequently, the number of genera included tends to be variable

A more detailed analysis using multiple markers (Fay et al. 2006) confirmed the monophyly of Gilliesioideae as a whole, as were the two tribes, although some genera such as Ipheion and Nothoscordum were biphyletic. In general the Gilliesieae, with their unusual floral morphology, have genera that are closely related. For instance Ancrumia, Gethyum and Solaria have been treated as three, two or one (Solaria) genus by different authors. (see Genera and notes)

APG III familial realignment  (tribe Gilliesieae) 2009 
In 2009, Chase et al. more formally brought together the three families, Agapanthaceae, Alliaceae, Amaryllidaceae, under the single Asparagalean monophyletic family, now renamed Amaryllidaceae from Alliaceae, reversing the Dahlgrenian process of family splitting. This necessitated reducing the existing ranks of the component subfamilial taxa.  This formed the basis for the 2009 APG classification (APGIII). Thus subfamily Gilliesioideae became tribe Gilliesieae (Baker, J. Linn. Soc., Bot. 14: 509. 24 Apr
1875) within subfamily Allioideae of family Amaryllidaceae. Within the tribe they included thirteen genera including Leucocoryne s.l. (see Genera).

The full taxonomy of tribe Gilliesieae remains unresolved. Of the South America genera, a number have common features (tunicate bulbs, inflorescences with unarticulated pedicels, and one or two bracts subtending the inflorescence). These are Ipheion Raf., Leucocoryne Lindl., Nothoscordum Kunth, Tristagma Poepp., and Zoellnerallium Crosa. The position of Ipheion is particularly problematic.

Division of Ipheion (resurrection of Beauverdia) 
In 1972, Ipheion was divided into two sections, Hirtellum and Ipheion. However, the development of phylogenetic analysis revealed that Ipheion was not monophyletic, although the division into sections was later supported. Beauverdia Herter had been first described in 1943. Originally it was created to distinguish those species with unifloral inflorescences from others with plurifloral inflorescences within Nothoscordum and other genera, no longer considered Amaryllidaceae. As proposed it had ten species but its independence was short lived, being returned to a synonym of Ipheion, and a number of species were transferred to other genera, including Nothoscordum and Tristagma.

In 2014, Ipheion section Hirtellum was again raised to genus rank and restored to the tribe, being distinguished from other Ipheion species, under the older name of Beauverdia, with four species found in Argentina, southern Brazil, and Uruguay.

Division of Gilliesieae and resurrection of Leucocoryneae 
In 2014 Sassone also proposed resurrecting an older taxon, Leucocorynae to include six genera, Beauverdia (4 species), Ipheion s.s. (3 species), Leucocoryne s.l. (15 species), Nothoscordum (c. 20 species), Tristagma (c. 20 species) and Zoellnerallium (2 species). Leucocorynae had originally been described by Ravenna in 2001 as a tribe of Gilliesioideae, to include Leucocoryne together with Tulbaghia (now in separate tribe, Tulbaghieae) on morphological grounds, but it was not adopted. Instead, as described by Rudall et al. (2002) and Fay et al. (2006) there was a general recognition, as described above of two tribes, Ipheieae nom. nud. (4 genera) and Gilliesieae (7 genera) differing by actinomorphic floral symmetry and the presence of septal nectaries in the former. Subsequently Zoellnerallium was added to the Ipheieae,  even though with the reduction of Gilliesioideae to the tribe Gilliesieae, the older divisions could no longer be recognised, at least as tribes (possibly subtribes).

This now formally divides tribe Gilliesieae s.l. into two tribes, Gilliesieae s.s. (8 genera) and Leucocoryneae (6 genera). This new tribe corresponds to the older Ipheieae, together with the two more recent additions of Beauverdia and Zoellnerallium and includes about 65 species, although this could be closer to 130, according to Ravenna's proposals for Nothoscordum which would increase its species from 20 to about 60.

The taxonomy of Gilliesieae s.s. remains difficult with limited sampling, because of the problem of obtaining material from these little-known plants. Hence the different treatment of a number of the genera by different authors. (see Genera and notes)

Genera

Included genera 
Included genera according to Chase et al.,  as modified by Sassone et al. 2014.

 Tribe Leucocoryneae (Ipheieae group) (Ravenna) Sassone, S.C. Arroyo & Giussani

Beauverdia Herter (1943).
Ipheion Raf. (1836). 
Leucocoryne Lindl. (1830).
Nothoscordum Kunth (1843).
Tristagma Poepp. (1833).
Zoellnerallium Crosa (1975).

 Tribe Gilliesieae s.s.

Ancrumia Harv. ex Baker (1877).
Erinna Phil. (1864).
Gethyum Phil. (1873).
Gilliesia Lindl. (1826). Type species
 (including Pabellonia Quezada & Martic. and Stemmatium Phil.)
Miersia Lindl. (1826).
Schickendantziella Speg. (1903).
Solaria Phil. (1858).
Speea Loes. (1927).
Trichlora Baker (1877).

Uncertain, doubtful or former genera 
Three genera have been transferred to Allium. Caloscordum Herb. (1844)., which is now more properly considered part of Allium, Both Herbert (1844) and Lindley (1847) had originally considered it a distinct genus, while others considered it as part of Nothoscordum.(Li 1996) Milula is embedded in Allium as a section. Garaventia is considered part of Tristagma. Muilla was included in the Allioideae by Dahlgren, but in tribe Brodiaeeae. That tribe was subsequently raised to family status as Themidaceae.

Caloscordum Herb. (1844). (Subgenus of Allium)
Garaventia Looser (1941). (syn. Tristagma)
Milula Prain (1896). (Section of Allium)
Muilla S.Watson ex Bentham (1883). (Themidaceae)
Nectaroscordum Lindl. (1836). (Subgenus of Allium)

Species 
There are about eighty species included in the tribe.

Distribution 
The Gilliesieae are endemic to the southern part of South America, predominantly Chile. The Leucocoryneae are also a South American tribe with the exception of two species of Nothoscordum  (N bivalve, N. gracile) which extend to southern North America, otherwise they are found in southern Brazil, Argentina, Uruguay and Chile. (see map in Stevens 2013).

Notes

References

Bibliography

General 
 
 

 Available on Google Books

Amaryllidaceae (Gilliesieae)

Genera

Databases 

Allioideae
Monocot tribes